Blu Hydrangea is the stage name of Joshua Cargill (born 15 February 1996), a Northern Irish drag queen from Belfast who is known for competing on the first series of RuPaul's Drag Race UK (2019) and later winning the first season of RuPaul's Drag Race: UK vs the World (2022).

Career
Blu Hydrangea was announced as part of the cast of RuPaul's Drag Race UK on 21 September 2019 and subsequently finishing in fifth place on the series, being eliminated in the "Thirsty Work" episode, losing the lip sync to fellow contestant Cheryl Hole.

Outside of Drag Race, Blu Hydrangea is a well-known make-up queen, part of a band called the Frock Destroyers (with Baga Chipz and Divina de Campo). They also host the BBC web series Strictly Frocked Up, a weekly web series where they and another drag queen watch and review each episode of Strictly Come Dancing.

In January 2022, they were announced as one of the nine contestants on RuPaul's Drag Race: UK vs the World. On 8 March 2022, Blu Hydrangea was announced as the winner of the series, becoming the first Northern Irish queen to win across the franchise.

Personal life
Cargill grew up in Royal Hillsborough but later moved to live in Belfast. They confirmed in a March 2022 interview that they identify as non-binary.

Filmography

Television

Web

Music videos

Discography

Singles

As lead artist

As featured artist

With the Frock Destroyers

Frock4Life (2020)

Awards and nominations

References

External links 

1996 births
20th-century LGBT people from Northern Ireland
21st-century LGBT people from Northern Ireland
Living people
Drag queens from Northern Ireland
Transgender people from Northern Ireland
Non-binary people from Northern Ireland
Non-binary drag performers
Musicians from Belfast
RuPaul's Drag Race UK contestants
Drag Race (franchise) winners